The 2019 Piala Belia was the ninth season of the Piala Belia since its establishment in 2008. The league is currently the youth level (U19) football league in Malaysia. PKNS U19 are the defending champions. 21 teams competed in this season. All teams were drawn into two different groups, and plays in a maximum of 20 home-and-away matches. Top four teams after the completion of group stage matches progressed to knockout stage.

Teams
The following teams were participating in the 2019 Piala Belia.

Group A
 Felda United U19
 Kelantan U19
 Kuala Lumpur U19
 Melaka U19
 PJ City U19
 PKNP U19
 PKNS U19
 Selangor United U19
 SSBJ U17
 UiTM U19
 Perlis U19

Group B
 AMD U16
 Johor Darul Ta'zim IV
 Kedah U19
 Negeri Sembilan U19
 Pahang U19
 Perak U19
 Pulau Pinang U19
 Sabah U19
 Sarawak U19
 Selangor U19
 Terengganu IV

League table

Group A

Group B

Result table

Group A

Group B

Knock-out stage

Bracket

See also
 2019 Piala Presiden

References

External links
 Football Association of Malaysia
 SPMB 

Piala Belia
2019 in Malaysian football